Han is a Dutch masculine given name. It can be a short form of Johannes or of Hendrik/Henricus.  People with the name include:

Masculine given name 
Han Ahmedow (1936–2006), Prime Minister of Turkmenistan
Han Bennink (born 1942), Dutch jazz musician
Han van den Berg (born 1925), Dutch rower
Han Berger (born 1950), Dutch football player and coach
Han Bergsma (born 1961), Dutch sailor
Han ten Broeke (born 1969), Dutch VVD politician
Han Dade (1878–1940), Dutch sports director, co-founder of FC Ajax
Han T. Dinh, director of vehicle engineering for the United States Postal Service
Han van Dissel (born 1956), Dutch business theorist
Han Drijver (1927–1986), Dutch field hockey player
Han Grijzenhout (born 1932), Dutch football player and manager
Han Groenewegen (1888–1980), Dutch architect
Han G. Hoekstra (1908–1988), Dutch poet and children's writer
Han Hollander (1886–1943), Dutch radio sports journalist
Han Hoogerbrugge (born 1963), Dutch digital artist
Han Kulker (born 1959), Dutch middle distance runner
Han van Loghem (1881–1940), Dutch architect, furniture designer and town planner
Han van Lom (1918–1945), Dutch World War II figure
Han Mahmud (Xan Mehmûd; died 1866), Kurdish Lord
Han van Meegeren (1889–1947), Dutch painter and famous forger
Han Meijer (born 1949), Dutch polymer chemist
Han Nefkens (born 1954), Dutch writer and art collector
Han Nijssen (1935–2013), Dutch ichthyologist
Han Nolan (born 1956), American writer of young adult fiction
Han Hendrik Piho (born 1993), Estonian Nordic skier
Han Polman (born 1963), Dutch D66 politician, King's Commissioner of Zeeland
Han Ryner (1861–1938), pseudonym of Jacques Élie H.A. Ner, French philosopher, activist and novelist
Han Schröder (1918–1992), Dutch architect and educator
Han Schuil (born 1958), Dutch multimedia artist
Han van Senus (1900–1976), Dutch water polo player
Han Snel (1925–1998), Dutch-born Indonesian painter on Bali
Han Stijkel (1911–1943), Dutch Resistance activist
Han Vinck  (born 1950s), Dutch information theorist
Han de Vries (born 1941), Dutch oboist
Han F. de Wit (born 1944), Dutch research psychologist
Han Yerry (1724–1794), Oneida native American who fought in the American Revolutionary War
Han Zuilhof (born 1965), Dutch organic chemist

Feminine given name
Han Nolan (born 1956), American writer of young adult fiction

Fictional characters 
 Han Solo, in the Star Wars universe
 Han Pritcher, in the Foundation universe by Isaac Asimov
 Han Fastolfe, in the Elijah Baley Robots series by Isaac Asimov
 Han de Wit, titular character of a 1972 Dutch novel and 1990 movie

Dutch masculine given names